Hallenberg is a town in the Hochsauerland district, in North Rhine-Westphalia, Germany.

Geography
Hallenberg is situated approximately 15 km southeast of Winterberg and 35 km north of Marburg (in Hesse).

Neighbouring places 
 Allendorf (in Hesse)
 Bad Berleburg
 Bromskirchen (in Hesse)
 Frankenberg, Hesse
 Lichtenfels, Hesse
 Medebach
 Winterberg

Division of the town 
Hallenberg consists of 4 districts: the town proper and 3 villages:
 Hallenberg (2,660 inhabitants, 34.72 km²)
 Braunshausen (350 inhabitants, 9.08 km²)
 Hesborn (1,060 inhabitants, 14,18 km²)
 Liesen (780 inhabitants, 7,38 km²)

Personalities 
Adolf Winkelmann (born 1946), film director and producer

Currency 

From 1917 until the 1920s Hallenberg, like many German towns, produced its own currency, known as Notgeld. During the First World War this was because the value of the official coinage exceeded its face value, so coins were hoarded or sold for their metal, and then from about 1923 the rate of hyperinflation meant that the central bank could not print and distribute the ever-higher banknote values quickly enough, so this was done locally.

Gallery

References

External links

 

 
Towns in North Rhine-Westphalia
Hochsauerlandkreis